The World Cinema Project (WCP), formerly World Cinema Foundation, is a non-profit organization devoted to the preservation and restoration of neglected world cinema, founded by Martin Scorsese.

History
Founded in 2007 as the World Cinema Foundation by  American filmmaker Martin Scorsese, it was inspired by the work of The Film Foundation in the United States, a similar venture which Scorsese founded with George Lucas, Stanley Kubrick, Steven Spielberg and Clint Eastwood in 1990.

Trances, a music documentary about Nass El Ghiwane an influential Moroccan music group, was picked by Martin Scorsese as the inaugural release for the foundation; it was screened at the Cannes Film Festival in 2007 and at Djemaa el-Fna square in Morocco.

Description and governance
The World Cinema Foundation is backed by an advisory board "Filmmaker Council" which includes Martin Scorsese, Fatih Akin, Souleymane Cissé, Guillermo del Toro, Stephen Frears, Alejandro González Iñárritu, Wong Kar-Wai, Abbas Kiarostami, Deepa Mehta, Ermanno Olmi, Raoul Peck, Cristi Puiu, Walter Salles, Abderrahmane Sissako, Elia Suleiman, Bertrand Tavernier, Wim Wenders, and Tian Zhuangzhuang.

After leaving his position at the Film Society of Lincoln Center, Kent Jones became the foundation's executive director.

Restored films

Upcoming restorations

References

Notes

External links
Official Film Foundation site
Roger Ebert.com articlesabout said projectand the many films restored

Film organizations in the United States
Organizations established in 2007
Rediscovered films